Nico Santos may refer to:

Nico Santos (actor) (born 1979), American actor
Nico Santos (singer) (born 1993), German-Spanish singer, songwriter, producer
Niccolo "Nico" Santos, a character in the Philippine romantic fantasy drama television series Written in Our Stars